Assara albicostalis is a moth of the  family Pyralidae. It has a wide distribution and has been recorded from India, Sri Lanka, Thailand, Sabah, the Philippines, Taiwan, Sulawesi, Australia, Fiji, Tahiti, Samoa, Hawaii and the Marquesas. This is the type species of genus Assara.

The forewings of this species are ferruginous, with a white costal stripe, a few minute blackish marks at the hind border and a cinereous, denticulated submarginal line. Wingspan approximately 9 lines / 19mm.

The wingspan is 12–20 mm. There are about three overlapping generations per year and a partial fourth. The larvae bore the pods of various stored products, including Garuga pinnata.

References

Phycitini
Moths described in 1863
Moths of Asia
Moths of Oceania